BKHS may refer to:
 Bishop Kearney High School (Irondequoit, New York), United States
 Bishop Kearney High School (New York City), United States
 Bishop Kelley High School, Tulsa, Oklahoma, United States
 Bishop Kelly High School, Boise, Idaho, United States
 Bishop Kenny High School, Jacksonville, Florida, United States